"Do You Want Fries with That" is a song written by Casey Beathard and Kerry Kurt Phillips, and recorded by American country music artist Tim McGraw. It was released in May 2005 as the fourth single from McGraw's 2004 album Live Like You Were Dying.  The song peaked at number 5 on the U.S. Billboard Hot Country Songs chart.

Content
"Do You Want Fries with That" is a moderate up-tempo. The song's male narrator is an employee at a fast-food restaurant. Having just lost his wife and kids to another man, he meets the wife's new partner at the drive-through window. The narrator further explains that he has been living in near poverty since the other man practically stole his previous lifestyle, then sarcastically asks him "Do you want fries with that?"

Chart positions

Year-end charts

References

2005 singles
2004 songs
Tim McGraw songs
Songs written by Casey Beathard
Comedy songs
Song recordings produced by Byron Gallimore
Song recordings produced by Tim McGraw
Curb Records singles
Songs written by Kerry Kurt Phillips